Catiguá is a municipality in the state of São Paulo in Brazil. The population is 7,855 (2020 est.) in an area of 148 km². The elevation is 483 m.

References

Municipalities in São Paulo (state)